Thomas Mein (born 12 January 1999) is a British cyclist who currently rides for Hope Factory Racing in cyclo-cross and mountain biking. His most notable achievements are winning the under-23 men's race at the UCI Cyclo-cross World Cup in Tábor, Czech Republic in November 2019, and winning the British National Cyclo-Cross Championships in 2022.

Career

Junior career 
Mein started out his career with the amateur cycling teams Hetton Hawks CC and Derwentside CC. One of Mein's major races was the Koppenbergcross of November 2016, when Mein was only seventeen-years old; Mein was up against a pack of experienced Belgian and Dutch riders, and compatriot Tom Pidcock. Due to these factors, Mein was considered the underdog, and not expected to have a podium finish. However, Mein rode a smart race, and finished in first position.

Tarteletto–Isorex
In 2018, Mein joined the Belgian cyclo-cross team . Mein's career turned professional and as he began to rise to the podium more and more, Mein had his eyes set on the 2019 UCI Cyclo-cross World Cup which he had missed out on first-place during November 2018.

In November 2019, Mein claimed his first win at a UCI Cyclo-cross World Cup race in Tábor, Czech Republic. Mein timed his attack perfectly with an eleven-second lead over Swiss rider Kevin Kuhn. To add on to Mein's accomplishments, throughout this season and previous seasons Mein has generally finished within the top-twenty echelon of racers.

Mein has also claimed several other podium finishes throughout previous seasons, including the National Trophy Series in Derby, the British National Cyclo-cross Championships at Cyclopark in Gravesend, and the DVV Trofee in Niel, Belgium.

Tormans CX Team and Canyon DHB
On 28 January 2020, Mein announced on social media that he would be joining Tormans XC Team in cyclo-cross. On 5 March 2020, Mein joined British UCI Continental team  for the 2020 road season. Due to winning the UEC European Under-23 Championships in 2020, Mein therefore won the first international medal for Tormans CX Team. On 5 September 2021, Mein embarked on his first Tour of Britain with Canyon dhb SunGod. His best result was eleventh position at the finish of Stage 7.

Hope Factory Racing 
As of 14 April 2022, Mein will be riding for the British cyclo-cross team Hope Factory Racing.

Major Results

Cyclo-cross

2016–2017
 Junior DVV Trophy
1st Koppenberg
 Junior National Trophy Series
2nd Derby
3rd Houghton-le-Spring
2018–2019
 National Trophy Series
2nd Derby
 Under-23 DVV Trophy
3rd Niel
 3rd National Championships
2019–2020
 National Trophy Series
1st Derby
 UCI Under-23 World Cup
1st Tábor
3rd Nommay
 Under-23 DVV Trophy
3rd Loenhout
2020–2021
 UCI Under-23 World Cup
1st Tábor
 2nd  UEC European Under-23 Championships
2021–2022
 1st  National Championships
 National Trophy Series
1st Broughton Hall
2022–2023
 2nd  Team relay, UCI World Championships
 2nd Clanfield
 3rd Overall National Trophy Series
1st South Shields
1st Gravesend
2nd Derby
3rd Broughton Hall
 3rd National Championships

Mountain Bike
2022
 2nd Cross-country, National Championships
 2nd Marathon, National Championships

Road

2019
 National Circuit Series
2nd Newcastle
2021
 3rd Ilkley GP
2022
 Tour Series
1st Guisborough

References

External links

British male cyclists
English male cyclists
Road racing cyclists
Cyclo-cross cyclists
1999 births
Living people